Al-Nabi Shayth (also Nabi Chit or Nabi Sheeth, literally "The Prophet Seth"), is a village in the Valley of Beqa' and District of Ba'albek in Lebanon. The village was called by that name because it is considered to contain the burial-site of Seth the son of Adam. A mosque was built on the burial site and it contains the grave of Seth inside the mosque (a rival tradition placed Seth's tomb in the Palestinian village of Bashsheet, and likewise in the Iraqi city of Mosul). The village is also the hometown of Abbas al-Musawi, who was a leader of Hezbollah, and an influential Twelver Shi'ite cleric. The village of Al-Nabi Sheeth is predominantly inhabited by people with the surnames Helbawi, Al-Moussawi, Hazimeh and Chokr.

History
Ibn Jubayr (1145–1217 CE) noted:

In 1838, Eli Smith noted En-Neby Sheeth as a "Metawileh" village in the district of Baalbek.

On 22 December 1998 the Israeli Air Force bombed a farm house in al-Nabi Shayth killing a woman and six children. The target had been an antenna belonging to Hizbollah’s Voice of the Oppressed radio station. Hizbollah responed by firing rockets into Northern Israel, injuring sixteen people. Two weeks later the IAF again tried to destroy the radio mast, injuring seven villagers.

See also
 Nabi Habeel Mosque, Syria
 Karak Nuh
 List of burial places of Abrahamic figures

References

Bibliography

External links
 Nabi Chit, Localiban 

Populated places in Baalbek District
Shia Muslim communities in Lebanon